Lacosoma chiridota, the scalloped sack-bearer, is a species of sack-bearer moth in the family Mimallonidae.

The MONA or Hodges number for Lacosoma chiridota is 7659.

References

Further reading

External links

 

Mimallonidae
Moths described in 1864